Unai Simón Mendibil (born 11 June 1997) is a Spanish professional footballer who plays as a goalkeeper for La Liga club Athletic Bilbao and the Spain national team.

Club career
Simón was born in Vitoria-Gasteiz, Álava, Basque Country, and raised in the nearby village of Murgia; he joined Athletic Bilbao's youth system in 2011, from CD Aurrerá de Vitoria. He made his debut as a senior with the farm team in the 2014–15 season, in the Tercera División. 

On 8 June 2016, Simón was promoted to the reserves, recently relegated to Segunda División B. He immediately became a starter for the side, contributing with 29 appearances during the campaign.

On 2 June 2017, Simón was called up to the main squad for the pre-season by new first team manager José Ángel Ziganda, but continued to appear exclusively for the Bs. On 13 July 2018, he signed a contract extension until 2023, and was loaned to Segunda División side Elche CF two weeks later.

On 15 August 2018, after Kepa Arrizabalaga's departure from the club and Iago Herrerín's injury, Simón was recalled by Athletic. He initially appeared to be behind the older Álex Remiro in the queue for selection, but made his professional – and La Liga – debut five days later, starting in a 2–1 home win against CD Leganés. In just his third league appearance for Athletic Bilbao, Simón played in a 1–1 draw with Real Madrid where he made several key saves and was named player of the match. However, when Herrerín regained full fitness in October 2018 he was made the starting goalkeeper, with Simón's only appearances over the subsequent four months coming in the Copa del Rey.

For the 2019–20 season, Simón was given the #1 squad number and began the campaign as first choice, keeping a clean sheet in an opening day win over FC Barcelona. He continued his strong form throughout the season, missing two fixtures with illness and completing 33 matches in the league, conceding 29 goals to finish third in the Zamora Trophy rankings. On the 37th, penultimate, matchday, he was sent off during the first half against CD Leganés for a 'last man' challenge outside the penalty area, with the resultant suspension ending his season a game early; with ten men, Athletic Bilbao lost 2–0 to end their slim hopes of qualifying for the UEFA Europa League.

In August 2020, he signed a new contract with the club running to the summer of 2025, with no buyout clause.

International career
Simón was selected for Spain at under-19 and under-21 levels. He was a member of the squad that won the 2015 UEFA European Under-19 Championship, albeit as the backup goalkeeper to Antonio Sivera during the tournament.

On 1 September 2017, Simón debuted with the under-21 team against Italy. He was selected for the 2019 UEFA European Under-21 Championship, playing the first game of the group stage as Spain once more finished as champions (Sivera was again first-choice).

Simón received his first call up to the senior side on 20 August 2020, for the initial two matches of the 2020–21 UEFA Nations League. Despite having made an error which led to a goal at club level a few days earlier, he was selected for his full debut on 11 November 2020, playing the entirety of a friendly against the Netherlands.

On 24 May 2021, Simón was included in Luis Enrique's 24-man squad for UEFA Euro 2020. He started all of the team's matches, and caused an own goal in the 5–3 last-16 win over Croatia when he was unable to control a long backwards pass by Pedri. Luis Enrique praised his mentality for having recovered from that mistake. He then managed to save two penalties as Spain won the shootout against Switzerland in the quarter-finals after a 1–1 draw, for which he was also awarded the Star of the Match. The semi-final against Italy ended with the same score, and Simón saved the first attempt in the shootout by Manuel Locatelli, but the Italians prevailed.

Simón was also called up for the Spanish Olympic team for the delayed 2020 tournament in Japan. With Simón as the starting goalkeeper they reached the final, but lost to Brazil.

Career statistics

Club

International

Honours
Athletic Bilbao
Supercopa de España: 2020–21
Copa del Rey runner-up: 2019–20, 2020–21

Spain U19
UEFA European Under-19 Championship: 2015

Spain U21
UEFA European Under-21 Championship: 2019

Spain U23
Summer Olympic silver medal: 2020

Spain
UEFA Nations League runner-up: 2020–21
Individual
UEFA La Liga Revelation Team of the Year: 2019–20

References

External links
  (archive)
 
 
 
 

1997 births
Living people
Footballers from Vitoria-Gasteiz
Spanish footballers
Spain youth international footballers
Spain under-21 international footballers
Spain international footballers
Olympic footballers of Spain
Association football goalkeepers
La Liga players
Segunda División B players
Tercera División players
CD Basconia footballers
Bilbao Athletic footballers
Athletic Bilbao footballers
Elche CF players
UEFA Euro 2020 players
Footballers at the 2020 Summer Olympics
2022 FIFA World Cup players
CD Aurrerá de Vitoria footballers
Olympic medalists in football
Olympic silver medalists for Spain
Medalists at the 2020 Summer Olympics